Anton Stepanovich Arensky (– ) was a Russian composer of Romantic classical music, a pianist and a professor of music.

Biography
Arensky was born into an affluent, music-loving family in Novgorod, Russia. He was musically precocious and had composed a number of songs and piano pieces by the age of nine. With his mother and father, he moved to Saint Petersburg in 1879, after which he studied composition at the Saint Petersburg Conservatory with Nikolai Rimsky-Korsakov.

After graduating from the Saint Petersburg Conservatory in 1882, Arensky became a professor at the Moscow Conservatory. Among his students there were Alexander Scriabin, Sergei Rachmaninoff, and Alexander Gretchaninov.

In 1895, Arensky returned to Saint Petersburg as the director of the Imperial Choir, a post for which he had been recommended by Mily Balakirev. He retired from this position in 1901, living off a comfortable pension and spending his remaining time as a pianist, conductor, and composer.

Arensky died of tuberculosis in a sanatorium in Perkjärvi, in what was then the Russian-administered Grand Duchy of Finland, at the age of 44. While very little is known about his private life, Rimsky-Korsakov alleges that drinking and gambling undermined his health. He was buried in the Tikhvin Cemetery.

The Antarctic Arensky Glacier was named after him.

Music

Pyotr Ilyich Tchaikovsky was the greatest influence on Arensky's musical compositions. Indeed, Rimsky-Korsakov said, "In his youth, Arensky did not escape some influence from me; later, the influence came from Tchaikovsky. He will quickly be forgotten."  The perception that he lacked a distinctive personal style contributed to long-term neglect of his music, though in recent years, a large number of his compositions have been recorded.  Especially popular are the Variations on a Theme of Tchaikovsky for string orchestra, Op. 35a - arranged from the slow movement of Arensky's 2nd string quartet, and based on one of Tchaikovsky's Songs for Children, Op. 54.

Arensky was, perhaps, at his best in the genre of chamber music, in which he wrote two string quartets, two piano trios, and a piano quintet.

Selected works

Opera
Сон на Волге (Son na Volge / Dream on the Volga), Op. 16 (1888), libretto by Anton Arensky after Alexander Ostrovsky's play Voyevoda, premiere: January 2, 1891 [OS December 21, 1890], Moscow, Bolshoy Theatre
Рафаэль (Rafael / Raphael), Op. 37 (1894), libretto by A. Kryukov, premiere: May 6 [OS April 24], 1894, Moscow, Conservatory
Наль и Дамаянти (Nal' i Damayanti / Nal and Damayanti), Op. 47 (1903), after Indian epos "Mahabharata", libretto by Modest Ilyich Tchaikovsky after the novel by Vasily Zhukovsky, premiere: January 22, [OS January 9], 1904, Moscow, Bolshoy Theatre)

Ballet
Egyptian Nights a.k.a. Une Nuit d'Égypte or Nuits égyptiennes (1900). Divertissement-Ballet in one act. Originally composed for the Imperial Ballet, St. Petersburg. Choreography by Lev Ivanov. Production was never given due to the death of the choreographer before completion. 
revival by Mikhail Fokine for the Imperial Ballet. Imperial Mariinsky Theatre, .
revival by Mikhail Fokine as Cléopâtre for the Ballets Russes. Théâtre du Châtelet, Paris, 2 June 1909. Additional music by Alexander Glazunov, Mikhail Glinka, Modest Mussorgsky, Nikolai Rimsky-Korsakov, Sergei Taneyev, and Nikolai Tcherepnin.

Orchestral

 (1881)
 (1883)
Suite No. 1 in G minor, Op. 7 (1885)
Intermezzo in G minor, Op. 13 (1882)
Symphony No. 2 in A major, Op. 22 (1889)
Suite No. 2 'Silhouettes', Op. 23 (originally for 2 pianos, 1892)
Suite No. 3 'Variations in C major', Op. 33 (originally for 2 pianos, 1894)
Variations on a Theme of Tchaikovsky, Op. 35a, for string orchestra (1894)
Fantasia on Themes of Ryabinin, Op. 48, for piano and orchestra (1899), also known as Fantasia on Russian Folksongs
Concerto for Violin and Orchestra in A minor, Op. 54 (1891)
 Pamyati Suvorova (To the Memory of Suvorov, 1900)

Chamber
String Quartet No. 1 in G major, Op. 11 (1888)
Serenade, Op. 30, No. 2, for violin and piano
Piano Trio No. 1 in D minor, Op. 32 (1894)
 (1894), scored either for standard string quartet or for violin, viola and two cellos
Piano Quintet in D major, Op. 51 (1900)
Two Pieces, Op. 12, for cello and piano
Four Pieces, Op. 56, for cello and piano
 (1905)

Piano
(for solo piano unless otherwise specified)
Suite for Two Pianos No. 1 in F major, Op. 15 (1888)
Suite for Two Pianos No. 2, Op. 23, "Silhouettes" (1892), also orchestral version
Four Morceaux, Op. 25 (1893)
Six Essais sur des rythmes oubliés, Op. 28 (ca. 1893)
Suite for Two Pianos No. 3 in C major, Op. 33, "Variations" (pub. 1894), also orchestral version
24 Morceaux caractéristiques, Op. 36 (covering all 24 major and minor keys) (1894)
Four Etudes, Op. 41 (1896)
Three Morceaux, Op. 42 (1898)
Six Caprices, Op. 43 (1898)
Près de la mer, six esquisses (sketches), Op. 52 (1901)
Six Pieces, Op. 53 (1901)
Suite for Two Pianos No. 4, Op. 62 (1903)
Twelve Preludes, Op. 63 (1903)
Twelve Pieces for Piano four hands, Op. 66 (1903)
Arabesques (suite), Op. 67 (1903)
Twelve Etudes, Op. 74 (1905)

Choral
Cantata for the Tenth Anniversary of the Sacred Coronation of Their Imperial Highnesses, Op. 25 (1893)
The Fountain of Bakhchisarai, Op. 46, cantata
The Diver, Op. 61, cantata

Solo vocal
Romances (4), for voice and piano, Op. 17
Three Vocal Quartets, Op. 57, with cello accompaniment

Arrangements of Arensky's music
Tempo di Valse from the Concerto for Violin and Orchestra in A minor, Op.54, arranged for violin and piano by Jascha Heifetz

References

External links

 
Biography on Dr. Estrella's Incredibly Abridged Dictionary of Composers
Texts and translations of Anton Arensky's vocal works at the LiederNet Archive
Anton Arensky Chamber Music discussion of works and soundbites

Brief overview of his life and information about Opus 35
 
 

1861 births
1906 deaths
People from Veliky Novgorod
People from Novgorodsky Uyezd
Russian male classical composers
Russian opera composers
String quartet composers
Russian Romantic composers
Male classical pianists
Male opera composers
Russian ballet composers
Russian classical pianists
19th-century classical composers
19th-century classical pianists
19th-century male musicians from the Russian Empire
20th-century classical composers
20th-century classical pianists
20th-century Russian male musicians
Pupils of Nikolai Rimsky-Korsakov
20th-century deaths from tuberculosis
Tuberculosis deaths in Finland
Burials at Tikhvin Cemetery